Gary Edward Cobb (born 6 August 1968 in Luton) is an English former professional footballer.

Playing career
Cobb started out with his home town club Luton Town. After four years at Luton, and loan spells out at Northampton Town and Swansea City, he had only made nine league appearances and was subsequently sold to Fulham. After only a year at Fulham, Cobb left to combine work with the Chelsea Community Scheme with non-League football.

References

1968 births
Living people
English Football League players
Footballers from Luton
English footballers
Luton Town F.C. players
Northampton Town F.C. players
Swansea City A.F.C. players
Fulham F.C. players
Chesham United F.C. players
Aylesbury United F.C. players
St Albans City F.C. players
Chertsey Town F.C. players
Bedford Town F.C. players
Berkhamsted Town F.C. players
Association football wingers